Charlie Richard Balun (June 12, 1948 – December 18, 2009) was an American writer and film critic for several horror magazines including Fangoria and Gorezone.

He died in California of cancer on December 18, 2009, aged 61.

Books
The Connoisseur's Guide to the Contemporary Horror Film (1983)
Deep Red Horror Handbook  Fantaco Enterprises (July 1989) 
The Gore Score  Fantaco Publications (June 1987) 
Gore Score 2001: The Splatter Years Obsidian Books (November 2000) 
Horror Holocaust Fantaco Enterprises, 1986 
Beyond Horror Holocaust: A Deeper Shade of Red Fantasma Books (December 15, 2003) 
More Gore Score: Brave New Horrors Key West, FL : Fantasma Books, c1995. 
Lucio Fulci : beyond the gates. 2nd ed. Key West, FL: Fantasma Books, 1997; 
Ninth and Hell Street (novel) Fantaco Enterprises (April 1990);

References

External links

 Interview

1948 births
2009 deaths
American film critics
20th-century American novelists
20th-century American male writers
Deaths from cancer in California
Place of birth missing
Place of death missing
American male novelists
20th-century American non-fiction writers
American male non-fiction writers